Matthew Morgan (born 23 April 1992) is a Wales international rugby union player currently playing at fullback for Cardiff Rugby.

Club career
Morgan has previously played for Bridgend Athletic RFC, Swansea RFC, Bridgend RFC and the Ospreys. On 5 May 2014, Morgan signed for English club Bristol Rugby, despite competing in the RFU Championship from the 2014–15 season. During his time at Bristol Morgan was a crowd favourite, and was named Greene King IPA Championship Player of the Year for the 2014–15 season; nonetheless, Morgan decided to leave Bristol at the end of the 2015–16 season and return to Wales to sign for Cardiff Rugby, citing a desire to improve his chances into the Wales national team.

International career
Morgan has played for Wales U20 and has had 4 caps with 64 points. He was a part of the Wales U20 side which defeated New Zealand 9-6 during the 2012 Junior World Championships, becoming the first side ever to beat New Zealand at U20 level, and the first victory by any Wales side over New Zealand since the 1950s.

Morgan made his Wales international debut versus South Africa at Kings Park Stadium in Durban on 14 June 2014 as a second-half replacement. He was named in the extended Wales training squad for the 2015 Rugby World Cup, and was the only squad member not playing in a top European league. Morgan made two appearances for Wales at the World Cup in their matches against Uruguay and Fiji.

References

External links
 Ospreys Player Profile

1992 births
Living people
Rugby union players from Swansea
Welsh rugby union players
Wales international rugby union players
Ospreys (rugby union) players
Swansea RFC players
Cardiff Rugby players
Bristol Bears players
Rugby union fly-halves